United Nations Security Council resolution 656, adopted unanimously on 8 June 1990, after recalling Resolution 654 (1990) and reviewing a report by the Secretary-General, the council decided to extend the tasks of monitoring the ceasefire, demobilising and separating the Contras and other forces of the resistance in Nicaragua until 29 June 1990.

The resolution urged all parties involved to maintain and increase the speed of demobilisation so that it could be completed by 29 June 1990. It also requested the Secretary-General to report back to the council by this date. Reporting back on 29 June, the Secretary-General informed the council that demobilisation had been completed the day before, and that the United Nations Observer Group in Central America had helped in the conflict in Nicaragua.

See also
 History of Central America
 History of Nicaragua
 List of United Nations Security Council Resolutions 601 to 700 (1987–1991)

References

External links
 
Text of the Resolution at undocs.org

 0656
History of Central America
Politics of Central America
 0656
June 1990 events